Blepephaeus bipunctatus is a species of beetle in the family Cerambycidae. It was described by Stephan von Breuning and de Jong in 1941. It is known from Sumatra.

References

Blepephaeus
Beetles described in 1941